Meleagrid alphaherpesvirus 1 (MeHV-1) is a species of virus in the genus Mardivirus, subfamily Alphaherpesvirinae, family Herpesviridae, and order Herpesvirales.

References

External links
 

Alphaherpesvirinae